Operation Halberd was a British naval operation that took place on 27 September 1941, during the Second World War. The British were attempting to deliver a convoy from Gibraltar to Malta. The convoy was escorted by several battleships and an aircraft carrier, to deter interference from the Italian surface fleet, while a close escort of cruisers and destroyers provided an anti-aircraft screen.

The Italian fleet sortied after the convoy was detected, but turned back after learning the strength of the escorting force. Air attacks by Italian bombers and fighters damaged several ships, and forced one of the merchant vessels to be scuttled. The rest of the convoy arrived at Malta and discharged their cargo.

The convoy
Operation Halberd was at the time the largest Malta resupply effort of the war. Nine merchant ships carrying 81,000 tons of military equipment and supplies sailed from Liverpool on 16 September and from the Clyde on 17 September as part of convoy WS (Winston Specials) 11X, passing Gibraltar on 24 September 1941, with a close escort under the command of Rear-Admiral Harold Burrough. The nine ships were:
 'Convoy Commodore' Auxiliary Supply Ship
 Blue Funnel Line
 Ellerman's City Line
 Ellerman & Bucknall
 Clan Line
 Clan Line
 Blue Star Line
 Blue Star Line
 Union-Castle Line

British forces
Force H, under the command of Admiral James Somerville, accompanied the convoy as defence against Italian surface ships. Submarines  and  patrolled south of the Strait of Messina while  and  patrolled north of the Strait. Malta had recently received 27 long-range fighters (22 Bristol Beaufighters and 5 Bristol Blenheims), which had been bombing and strafing Italian airfields on Sicily and Sardinia, and would provide air cover for the convoy after Force H retired before reaching the Sicilian narrows.

Italian forces
Italian submarines deployed to ambush the British battleships thought to be planning a bombardment raid against the Italian coast. Dandolo, Adua and Turchese patrolled south of Ibiza while Axum, Serpente, Aradam and Diaspro patrolled east of the Balearic Islands. Squalo, Bandiera and Delfino patrolled Southwest of Sardinia and Narvalo was off the African shore of the Sicilian narrows. Light cruisers Muzio Attendolo and Duca degli Luigi di Savoia Duca degli Abruzzi of the 8th cruiser division sailed from Palermo with Maestrale-class destroyers Maestrale, Grecale and Scirocco of the 10th destroyer flotilla to take position off La Maddalena. Sardinia deployed thirty Macchi C.200, twenty Fiat CR.42 Falco and twenty-six Savoia-Marchetti SM.79 and SM.84 torpedo bombers against the convoy while Sicily deployed fifteen C.200, three Reggiane Re.2000, and nine Junkers Ju 87 with twenty-four Fiat BR.20, SM.79 and SM.84 as high-level bombers and plus three with torpedoes. More Italian aircraft were operational, but were assigned other missions including bombing Malta.

Prelude
Ships of the Mediterranean Fleet operating from Alexandria began making heavy radio traffic in the hope of diverting Luftwaffe attention to possible preparations for a major operation in the eastern Mediterranean. On 24 September Admiral Somerville shifted his flag from Nelson to Rodney and Nelson sailed west into the Atlantic at 18:15 escorted by Garland, Piorun and Isaac Sweers to give the impression the strength of Force H was being reduced. Nelson turned back after dusk to join the merchant ships from convoy WS 11X, now redesignated convoy GM 2 as the second convoy from Gibraltar to Malta. Force H separated from the merchant ships in the early hours of 25 September so Axis aerial reconnaissance might think only Force H was at sea. Fulmars from Ark Royal provided air cover over the convoy.

Italian aircraft found Force H on the afternoon of 25 September, and assumed the battleships were on a bombardment raid against the Italian coast. Since Ark Royal had been seen leaving Gibraltar, the Italians assumed Furious might be flying off aircraft to reinforce Malta while Ark Royal attacked Genoa. The Italian fleet sailed from Naples to take a defensive position with the 8th cruiser division off northern Sardinia, but was ordered not to engage the British fleet unless the Italians held a decisive superiority of forces.

Battle of 27 September
Force H rejoined the convoy at 07:10 27 September. Sixteen destroyers formed a bent line screen ahead of two columns of merchant ships. The port column was led by the cruiser Kenya, followed by Ajax, Clan MacDonald, Imperial Star, Rowallan Castle and City of Calcutta. The starboard column was led by the cruiser Edinburgh followed by Clan Ferguson, HMS Breconshire and City of Lincoln. Rodney took position behind the port wing of the screen followed by Prince of Wales. Nelson took position behind the starboard wing of the screen followed by Ark Royal in formation with the anti-aircraft cruisers Euryalus and Hermione. The cruiser Sheffield took position astern of the merchant ships, while the destroyers Piorun and Legion assumed plane guard positions astern of Ark Royal.

The battleships from Naples rendezvoused with the cruisers from Taranto at 10:40, and were joined by the 8th cruiser division at 11:48. The Italian fleet was faster than the battleships of Force H, but was inferior to the British force in firepower. Since Italian aircraft had reported only a single British battleship, the Italian fleet received authorization at noon to engage the British formation. The Regia Aeronautica was requested to provide increased air cover for the Italian fleet by 14:00.

The Regia Aeronautica launched a strike of 28 SM.79 and SM.84 torpedo planes with 20 Cr.42 fighters. The convoy came under air attack at 13:00. The strike was met by defending Fulmars and heavy anti-aircraft fire. Three bombers pressed through the barrage of starboard wing destroyers to launch torpedoes at Nelson. Nelson turned to comb the torpedo tracks, and inadvertently steadied on the reciprocal course of a torpedo which struck the port side of the forecastle. Nelson slowed to 15 knots, but maintained position in the convoy. The Italian plane had released the torpedo at a range of only  and endured concentrated anti-aircraft fire from Prince of Wales before being shot down by one of the Fulmars. Six more torpedo planes and 1 fighter failed to return from the strike. Friendly fire from Rodney and Prince of Wales shot down two Fulmars, and a patrolling Swordfish had been shot down by the Italian fighters before the strike ended at 13:30.

The Italian fleet was shadowed by British aircraft from Malta beginning at 13:07. At 14:30 the Italian fleet was about 40 miles from the convoy, but "...decided to return home around 14:30 on the 27th when..." it "... learned that the British had two battleships, a carrier and six cruisers at sea." Aircraft from Ark Royal shadowed the Italian fleet from 15:15 to 17:50. Cr.42 fighters arrived at 15:30 to provide air cover, but the squadron leader of the first flight was shot down by friendly fire from an Italian destroyer. Two more Italian pilots were lost when another flight of ten C.200s ran out of fuel and ditched at sea. At 14:46 Prince of Wales, Rodney, Sheffield, Edinburgh, and six destroyers steamed toward the Italian fleet; but were recalled at 17:00 before making contact, and rejoined the convoy at 18:30. Nelson, Rodney, Prince of Wales and Ark Royal turned west to return to Gibraltar escorted by Duncan, Fury, Gurkha, Lance, Legion, Lively. Garland, Piorun, and Isaac Sweers. Euryalus fell in astern of the port column of merchant ships while Sheffield and Hermione joined the starboard column as the remaining destroyers closed into a night steaming formation. The night steaming formation was attacked by a few torpedo bombers, and Imperial Star was struck by a single torpedo. Oribi took the damaged freighter in tow. Italian Motoscafo armato silurante (MAS torpedo boats) deployed through the Strait of Messina, but failed to find the convoy.

Aftermath
Hermione detached from the convoy to bombard Pantelleria so that airfield would be out of action when the convoy arrived in Malta. The damaged Imperial Star was scuttled without loss of life to maintain convoy speed of advance, and the convoy arrived in Malta on 28 September. Retiring Force H was attacked by three submarines; and Adua was sunk by Gurkha and Legion. Another Ark Royal Fulmar fell to friendly fire from Prince of Wales, raising British aircraft losses to three Fulmars from friendly fire and one Swordfish from enemy action. Italian aircraft losses were 21 including seven bombers and one fighter from enemy action, one fighter from friendly fire, and ten fighters from fuel exhaustion.

Admiral Somerville was knighted in recognition of his successful command of Force H during Operation Halberd. It was the second time Somerville had received that honour, and it occasioned a memorable congratulatory message from Admiral Cunningham: "Fancy, twice a knight at your age."

See also
 Battle of the Mediterranean
 Malta Convoys

Notes

References
 
 
 Merlins over Malta
 Malta Convoys
 The story of HMS Lightning - a WW2 destroyer 
 MEDITERRANEAN CONVOY OPERATIONS (London Gazette)

External links

Newsreel footage of Operation Halberd, as filmed from HMS Prince of Wales

Aerial operations and battles of World War II
Malta Convoys
Allied naval victories in the battle of the Mediterranean
Naval battles and operations of World War II involving the United Kingdom
September 1941 events